Günther Debusmann (born 12 June 1931) is a German racing cyclist. He rode in the 1958 Tour de France.

References

External links
 

1931 births
Living people
German male cyclists
Place of birth missing (living people)
Sportspeople from Saarbrücken
Cyclists from Saarland